Protein delta homolog 1, delta like non-canonical Notch ligand 1, fetal antigen 1 or preadipocyte factor 1 is a protein that in humans is encoded by the DLK1 gene.

It is expressed as a transmembrane protein, but a soluble form cleaved off by ADAM17 is active in inhibiting adipogenesis, the differentiation of pre-adipocytes into adipocytes.

It is a member of the EGF-like family of homeotic proteins.

Part of the Dlk1-DIO3 imprinting control region, this gene is one involved in the epigenetic process that causes a subset of genes to be regulated based on their parental origin. 

Such imprinted genes are required for the formation of the placenta as well as the development of cellular lineages such as those derived from the mesoderm and ectoderm.

References

Further reading